Wicking may refer to:
 Capillary action, the ability of a liquid to flow in narrow spaces
 Christopher Wicking (1943–2008), British screenwriter and film critic

See also
 Wick (disambiguation)
 Wicking bed, an agricultural irrigation system used in arid countries where water is scarce
 Wicking fabric, used for moisture management in layered clothing